North Harbour or North Harbor may refer to:

Canada
 North Harbour, Newfoundland and Labrador, a community on St. Mary's Bay
 North Harbour, an unincorporated area in the Municipality of the County of Victoria, Nova Scotia
 North Harbour Island, a privately owned island in Lake Erie, administered by Ontario

New Zealand
 North Harbour, New Zealand, a suburb of Auckland
 North Harbour Rugby Union, the governing body for Rugby union in the North Harbour region
 North Harbour Stadium, a sports stadium in Auckland
 North Harbour (women's field hockey team)

United States
 North Harbor, Illinois, an unincorporated community in Clinton County
 North Harbor Tower, a skyscraper in Chicago, Illinois

Elsewhere
 North Harbour, Sydney, an inlet off Port Jackson extending into Manly Cove, Australia
 North Harbour, Portsmouth, a suburb of Portsmouth in South East England, United Kingdom

See also
 North Port (disambiguation)
 Northport (disambiguation)